James Ivory is an American film director, producer, and writer known for his films under Merchant Ivory Productions most notably A Room with a View (1986), Maurice (1987), Howards End (1992), and The Remains of the Day (1993).

Major associations

Academy Awards

British Academy Film Awards

Golden Globe Awards

Film Independent Spirit Awards

Festival awards

Cannes Film Festival

Guild awards

Directors Guild of America Award

Writers Guild of America Awards

References 

Lists of awards received by film director